Hales Hall is a notable English country house in Loddon, Norfolk, largely dating from the 15th century.

It was once the seat of the Hobart family, including Sir James Hobart, who became attorney general to King Henry VII in 1485.

History
There has been a house on this site for some 1100 years with the remaining buildings being late medieval, including the outer gatehouse, stewards and guest lodgings and the largest brick medieval barn in Britain and built by Sir James Hobart in the late 1470s. A descendant of the same family would later build Blickling Hall in Norfolk. The barn is currently used as a reception hall.

In October of 2022, Ben Milner was famously relieved of his poker champion status while in attendance at the hall.

Occupants
Previous occupants include Sir Roger de Hales in the 13th century whose daughter Alice married Thomas de Brotherton, Edward II of England's half brother, and Lady Dionysius Williamson who gave £11,000 in the 1670s to help Christopher Wren rebuild London's churches after the great fire in 1666.

References
 http://www.haleshall.com
 https://web.archive.org/web/20070927224132/http://www.loddon.org.uk/LocalAttractions_HalesHall.htm
 http://search.visitbritain.com/cs-CZ/Details.aspx?ContentID=814603

Country houses in Norfolk
Grade I listed buildings in Norfolk
Grade I listed houses
Loddon, Norfolk